IDEX Corporation, based in Northbrook, Illinois, is a publicly traded company engaged in the development, design, and manufacture of fluidics systems, optics systems, fire and rescue equipment, and other specialty engineered products.

History
IDEX was formed in 1988, when Kohlberg Kravis Roberts purchased several divisions of Houdaille Industries, which had recently been sold by KKR to Tube Instruments. Its first chairman and CEO was Donald N. Boyce. TI retained the John Crane seals business.

The company's name is an acronym of "Innovation, Diversity, and Excellence."

Divisions
Business units are divided into three segments:
 Fluid & Metering Technologies
 Health & Science Technologies
 Fire & Safety / Diversified Products

Products
IDEX Corporation's products, which include pumps, clamping systems, flow meters, optical filters, powder processing equipment, hydraulic rescue tools, and fire suppression equipment, are used in a variety of industries ranging from agriculture to semiconductor manufacturing.

Recent acquisitions
In May 1994, IDEX reached an agreement to acquire Hale Product, Inc., of Conshohocken, Pa., for $90 million.  Hale sells fire-trucks, portable pumps, ventilation systems, and the Hurst "Jaws of Life". 

In January 1998, IDEX agreed to buy Gast Manufacturing of Benton Harbor, Michigan, for $118 million. Gast manufactures compressors, vacuum pumps, air motors and other products.  

In June 2018, IDEX Corporation announced its acquisition of Phantom Controls, Incorporated.

In March 2021, IDEX Corporation completed its acquisition of Abel Pumps, L.P., and certain of its affiliates.

In June 2021, IDEX Corporation completed its acquisition of Airtech Group, Inc., US Valve Corporation and related entities.

In March 2022, IDEX Corporation completed its acquisition of Nexsight, LLC and its businesses – Envirosight, WinCan, MyTana and Pipeline Renewal Technologies (PRT).

In November 2022,  IDEX Corporation completed its acquisition of Muon Group and its subsidiaries - LouwersHanique, Veco, Millux, Tecan and Atul.

References

External links

Companies listed on the New York Stock Exchange
Companies based in Northbrook, Illinois
Tool manufacturing companies of the United States
Manufacturing companies based in Illinois
American companies established in 1988
Companies formed by management buyout